Saint-Paul-d'Espis (Languedocien: Sent Pau dels Pins) is a commune in the Tarn-et-Garonne department in the Occitanie region in southern France.

Geography
The village lies on the left bank of the Barguelonne, which forms all of the commune's northwestern border.

See also
Communes of the Tarn-et-Garonne department

References

Communes of Tarn-et-Garonne